Simone Bolelli and Andreas Seppi were the defending champions, but Bolelli chose to compete in São Paulo instead. Seppi played alongside Jeevan Nedunchezhiyan in the qualifying tournament, but lost in the qualifying competition to James Cerretani and Philipp Oswald.

Jean-Julien Rojer and Horia Tecău won the title, defeating Rohan Bopanna and Marcin Matkowski in the final, 4–6, 6–3, [10–3].

Seeds

Draw

Draw

Qualifying

Seeds

Qualifiers
  James Cerretani /  Philipp Oswald

Qualifying draw

References
 Main draw
 Qualifying draw

Doubles